Fleetwood Mac is the tenth studio album by British-American rock band Fleetwood Mac, released on 11 July 1975 by Reprise Records. It was the band's second eponymous album, the first being their 1968 debut album; it is sometimes referred to among fans as the White Album. This was the first Fleetwood Mac album with Lindsey Buckingham as guitarist and Stevie Nicks as vocalist, after Bob Welch departed the band in late 1974. It was also the band's last album to be released on the Reprise label until 1997's The Dance (the band's subsequent albums until then were released through Warner Bros. Records, Reprise's parent company).

The album peaked at number one on the US Billboard 200 chart dated 4 September 1976, 58 weeks after entering the chart, and spawned three top-twenty singles: "Over My Head", "Rhiannon", and "Say You Love Me", the last two falling just short of the top ten, both at number 11. It has been certified seven times platinum by the Recording Industry Association of America (RIAA) for sales of over seven million copies. Peaking at number 23 on the UK Albums Chart, it was a prelude to a run of hugely successful albums for the band in Britain, including four number ones: Rumours, Tusk, Tango in the Night, and Behind the Mask.

Background
In 1974, Fleetwood Mac relocated from England to California to manage the band's affairs better. In California, they recorded an album, Heroes Are Hard to Find, and set out on tour. Shortly after finishing the tour, Bob Welch (guitarist, singer, and composer) left the band, ending Fleetwood Mac's ninth lineup in eight years, to join the band Paris. Now looking for both a new guitarist and a recording studio, Mick Fleetwood met with producer Keith Olsen at Sound City Studios to listen to some demos. There, Olsen played Fleetwood an album he had recently engineered, titled Buckingham Nicks. Fleetwood particularly enjoyed the guitar solo on the song "Frozen Love", and decided to hire both Olsen and the guitarist, Lindsey Buckingham. However, Buckingham would not accept Fleetwood's offer unless he agreed to also hire Buckingham's musical and romantic partner, Stevie Nicks, even though they were close to breaking up. After an informal interview at a Mexican restaurant, Mick Fleetwood invited both Buckingham and Nicks to join the band, and this tenth lineup of the band proved to be its most successful. Within three months, the band had recorded the album Fleetwood Mac.

During the recording sessions, bassist John McVie took offence to Buckingham's assertive nature in the studio, particularly when telling the other band members what he wanted them to play. McVie informed Buckingham that "The band you're in is Fleetwood Mac. I'm the Mac. And I play the bass."

Many of the songs on Fleetwood Mac were written before Buckingham and Nicks joined the band. "Rhiannon", "I'm So Afraid", and "Monday Morning" were written and performed live by the duo and were initially slated to appear on a second Buckingham Nicks album. "Crystal" was recycled from the first Buckingham Nicks album, but with a different arrangement.

Like all of the band's studio albums except The Dance (1997), the front cover photo of Fleetwood Mac does not show the whole band, including, in this case, only drummer Mick Fleetwood (standing) and bass guitarist John McVie (kneeling).

Release and reception
Fleetwood Mac was released on 11 July 1975. Though the band experienced only modest success immediately after the release, they were determined to promote their new album, and after touring for several months, they started to see the results of their hard work. In an interview with Uncut, Stevie Nicks said of the album: "We just played everywhere and we sold that record. We kicked that album in the ass." 15 months after its release, Fleetwood Mac reached the top of the US charts.

In 2003, the album was ranked number 182 on Rolling Stone Magazine's list of "The 500 Greatest Albums of All Time", maintaining the ranking in a 2012 revised list.

Singles
All of the singles that derived from Fleetwood Mac used mixes of the songs different from those used on the album (and occasionally different takes, as in the case of "Over My Head"). A "single mix" was also created for "Blue Letter", and this mix was only available as the B-side of the "Warm Ways" single from 1975 until it was included as a bonus track on the 2004 re-issue of the album (along with an instrumental called "Jam #2" and the single versions of "Say You Love Me", "Rhiannon (Will You Ever Win)", and "Over My Head").

In the US, the album spawned three top twenty singles: "Over My Head", "Rhiannon", and "Say You Love Me", the last two falling just short of the top ten, both at number 11. A version of "Landslide" taken from the live reunion album The Dance was released as a single in the US in 1998 and reached number 51 on the Billboard Hot 100.

In the UK, the album's first single was "Warm Ways", which was not released as a single in the US. Initially, the album generated limited interest in the UK, and the first three singles released by the new lineup failed to enter the UK Singles Chart, while "Say You Love Me" reached number 40. Following the massive success of Rumours two years later, however, interest in the band reignited, Fleetwood Mac was re-released in 1978, and a reissue of "Rhiannon" peaked just outside the top 40, at number 46.

Commercial performance
The album debuted at number 183 on the US Billboard 200 chart dated 2 August 1975. It eventually reached its peak at number one on the chart dated 4 September 1976, which was 58 weeks after it had entered the chart. On 11 September 2018, the album was certified seven times platinum by the Recording Industry Association of America (RIAA) for sales of over seven million copies in the United States.

In the UK, the album debuted at number 49 on the UK Albums Chart dated 6 November 1976. It peaked at number 23 its second week on the chart. On 5 July 1978, the album was certified gold by the British Phonographic Industry (BPI) for sales of over 100,000 copies in the UK.

Track listing

Personnel
Fleetwood Mac
Lindsey Buckingham – electric, acoustic, and resonator guitar, banjo, vocals
Stevie Nicks – vocals
Christine McVie – keyboards, synthesizer, vocals
John McVie – bass guitar
Mick Fleetwood – drums, percussion

Additional personnel
Waddy Wachtel – rhythm guitar on "Sugar Daddy"

Production
Producers: Fleetwood Mac & Keith Olsen
Engineer: Keith Olsen
2nd Engineer: David Devore
Photograph: Herbert W. Worthington III

Charts

Weekly charts

Year-end charts

Certifications

See also
List of Billboard 200 number-one albums of 1976

References

Bibliography

1975 albums
Albums produced by Keith Olsen
Fleetwood Mac albums
Grammy Hall of Fame Award recipients
Reprise Records albums
Albums produced by John McVie
Albums produced by Mick Fleetwood
Albums produced by Christine McVie
Albums produced by Lindsey Buckingham
Albums recorded at Sound City Studios